is a Japanese manga series written by Kentarō Okamoto and illustrated by Riri Sagara. It was serialized in Kodansha's seinen manga magazine Weekly Young Magazine from January 2017 to March 2022. Kodansha published ten tankōbon volumes. Kodansha USA digitally published the manga in North America. An anime television series adaptation by Ezo'la aired in Japan from July to September 2019.

Premise
When their plane crashes during a school trip, four high school girls, Homare Onishima, Asuka Suzumori, Mutsu Amatani, and Shion Kujō, find themselves stranded on a remote island. Using the survival skills she picked up from her father, Homare helps the others to survive island life as they try to make the best of their situation.

Characters
 

A solemn school girl. Having had survival training with her father as a child, she has a bevy of knowledge on how to survive in critical conditions. As a result, Homare takes the role as the leader among the girls and teaches them how to survive on the island. 

A cheery and athletic girl who is a member of the basketball and track clubs. As the most physically fit among the girls, Asuka often accompanies Homare when they hunt or fish for food. 

A shy and intelligent girl who enjoys reading light novels and wants to become a yaoi writer in the future. As noted by Homare, Mutsu's intelligence and adaptability makes her most suited to survive in the wilderness. She takes the role as the cook among the girls.

A rich, spoiled girl. Shion is the most dexterous among the girls and is skilled with crafts. Many of the girls' actions are inspired by her childish demands. She has a dog at home named Arnold and plays the piano.

Homare's father, who taught her everything she knows about survival. He seeks out to rescue Homare and her friends after hearing of the plane crash.

A female student who also survived the plane crash. However, she is separated from Homare and her friends, as she is located on the other side of the island.

A male student who also survived the plane crash. He is located on the other side of the island alongside Rui.

A kind and gentle woman who died when Homare was a child.

Media

Manga
Are You Lost?, written by Kentarō Okamoto and illustrated by Riri Sagara, was serialized in Kodansha's seinen manga magazine Weekly Young Magazine from January 7, 2017, to March 7, 2022. Kodansha published ten tankōbon volumes from August 4, 2017, to April 6, 2022. 

Kodansha USA has licensed the manga in North America, who digitally published it in English from October 2, 2018, to October 18, 2022.

Volume list

Anime
An anime television series adaptation was announced in the 14th issue of Weekly Young Magazine on March 4, 2019. The series was produced by Ezo'la and directed by Nobuyoshi Nagayama, with Touko Machida handling series composition, and Junnosuke Nishio designing the characters. Akiyuki Tateyama composed the music. The series aired in Japan from July 2 to September 17, 2019 on Tokyo MX, MBS, and BS-NTV, and was simulcast by Crunchyroll. The series consists of 15-minute episodes. M.A.O, Hiyori Kono, Kiyono Yasuno, and Azumi Waki performed the series' opening theme song , while Yasuno performed the series' ending theme song .

Episode list

Reception
As of March 2022, the manga had over 1 million copies in circulation. Gadget Tsūshin listed the anime's Japanese name in their 2019 anime buzzwords list.

Notes

References

External links
 
 

2019 anime television series debuts
Anime series based on manga
Ezo'la
Kodansha manga
Medialink
School life in anime and manga
Seinen manga
Survival anime and manga
Tokyo MX original programming